Las Juntas is a district of the Abangares canton, in the Guanacaste province of Costa Rica.

Geography 
Las Juntas has an area of  km² and an elevation of  metres.

Villages
Administrative center of the district is the town of Las Juntas.

Other villages are Blanco, Concepción, Coyolito (partly), Chiqueros, Desjarretado, Huacas (partly), Irma, Jarquín (partly), Jesús, Lajas, Limonal, Limonal Viejo, Matapalo, Naranjos Agrios, Palma, Peña, Puente de Tierra, Rancho Alegre (partly), Rancho Ania (partly), San Cristóbal, San Juan Chiquito, Tortugal and Zapote.

Demographics 

For the 2011 census, Las Juntas had a population of  inhabitants.

Transportation

Road transportation 
The district is covered by the following road routes:
 National Route 1
 National Route 18
 National Route 145
 National Route 601
 National Route 602

References 

Districts of Guanacaste Province
Populated places in Guanacaste Province